Thérèse Dorny (born Thérèse Jeanne Longo-Dorni; 18 September 1891 – 14 March 1976) was a French film and stage actress.

Biography
Thérèse Jeanne Longo-Dorni was born on 18 September 1891 in Paris, Île-de-France, France, the only child to Gaudence Jean Baptiste Marie Longo-Dorni (born 1859) and Marie Antonia Longo-Dorni (née Junghanss, born 1865).

She began her career as a stage actress in 1913, and made her debut as a film actress in the 1930 film The Sweetness of Loving. She was best known for her roles in Cognasse (1932) and Les Diaboliques (1955).

Dorny married the French painter and graphic artist André Dunoyer de Segonzac on 19 December 1964 in Viroflay, Île-de-France, France, who she remained with until his death in 1974. 

Dorny died on 14 March 1976 in Saint-Tropez, Var, France.

Filmography

1930: The Sweetness of Loving (by René Hervil) - Lorette
1932: Cognasse (by Louis Mercanton) - Mme. Cognasse
1933: Knock (by Roger Goupillières and Louis Jouvet) - La dame en violet
1933: Ciboulette (by Claude Autant-Lara) - Zénobie
1935: Monsieur Sans-Gêne (by Karl Anton) - La féministe
1935: La mascotte (by Léon Mathot) - Dame Turlurette
1935: Divine (by Max Ophüls) - La Poison
1935: Les soeurs Hortensias (by René Guissart) - Madame Hormalin
1936: Passé à vendre (by René Pujol) - Marthe Dupont
1936: Un by la légion (by Christian Jaque) - Antoinette Espitalion
1936: Ménilmontant (by René Guissart) - Toinon
1937: À nous deux madame la vie (by Yves Mirande and René Guissart) - La femme de Toto la Vache
1937: La cantinier by la coloniale (by Henry Wulschleger) - Madame Piéchu
1937: Abus by confiance (by Henri Decoin) - La logeuse 
1938: Katia (by Maurice Tourneur) - La baronne
1938: Prince by mon coeur (by Jacques Daniel-Norman) - Isabelle Gatemouille
1938: Retour à l'aube (by Henri Decoin) - La directrice de la maison de couture
1938: Visages de femmes (by René Guissart) - Verdurette
1939: Whirlwind of Paris (by Henri Diamant-Berger) - (uncredited)
1941: The Acrobat (by Jean Boyer) - Pauline
1941: Un chapeau de paille d'Italie (by Maurice Cammage) - La baronne
1942: Les Petits Riens (by Raymond Leboursier) - L'habilleuse
1943: Une vie de chien (by Maurice Cammage) - Léocadie
1943: Ne le criez pas sur les toits (by Jacques Daniel-Norman) - Madame Noblet
1943: Une femme disparaît (by Jacques Feyder) - Lucie
1943: Behold Beatrice (or Ainsi va la vie) (by Jean by Marguenat) - Tante Hermance
1943: Le mort ne reçoit plus (by Jean Tarride) - Mademoiselle Verdelier
1945: La boîte aux rêves (by Yves Allégret) - Une femme (uncredited)
1946: La Fille du diable (by Henri Decoin) - Tante Hortense / Aunt Hortense
1946: Voyage surprise (by Pierre Prévert) - Mademoiselle Roberta
1947: Troisième cheminée à droite (by Jean Mineur) - La concierge
1949: The Legend of Faust (by Carmine Gallone) - Marta
1949: La Belle Meunière (by Marcel Pagnol)
1950: Uniformes et grandes manoeuvres (by René Le Hénaff) - Solange Duroc
1950: Tire au flanc (by Fernand Rivers) - Mme Blandin d'Ombelles
1951: Le passage de Vénus (by Maurice Gleize) - Zoé Chantoiseau
1953: The Beauty of Cadiz (by Raymond Bernard) - Blanche - l'habilleuse
1954: Adam Is Eve (by René Gaveau) - Mme Beaumont
1955: Les Diaboliques (by Henri-Georges Clouzot) - Mme. Herboux
1955: On ne badine pas avec l'amour (by Jean Desailly)
1956: Mitsou (by Jacqueline Audry) - Madame Papier - l'habilleuse
1959: Oh ! Qué mambo (by John Berry) - La belle-mère (final film role)

References

External links

 

20th-century French actresses
1891 births
1976 deaths
French film actresses